Lawton Wehle Fitt (born July 1953) is an American banker.

She completed college at Brown University, majoring in European history. After working in Burkina Faso with the Peace Corps, she studied at the University of Virginia's Darden School of Business.

From 1979 to 2002, Fitt was a banker with Goldman Sachs.

In 2002, Fitt succeeded David Gordon as secretary of the Royal Academy, holding that position until 2005.

References

1953 births
American bankers
Living people
Brown University alumni
University of Virginia Darden School of Business alumni
Goldman Sachs people
Peace Corps volunteers